Steelbox Networks Inc. was a privately owned company that engineered devices to distribute, store and retrieve large amounts of video data across IP networks. The company was noted for revolutionizing the video surveillance industry through the development of a specialized digital operating system (RTIK) addressing specific needs of video security networks such as problems with large scale storage and playback control. The technology provides secure paths to distribute, store and playback large amounts of live and recorded video. Its primary customer base was businesses and organizations that use  video monitoring systems, such as law enforcement, military and transportation.

Corporate history

Steelbox was founded in 2003 in Atlanta, Georgia by six engineers most of whom have worked together for 20 years and completed projects for Cisco Systems, Scientific Atlanta and Nortel Networks. The core team developed the operating system behind the Cisco PIX Firewall, which is widely used throughout the world today. The team also developed the concept of load balancing, a technology that speeds up the flow of information over the Internet by determining the best way to route data requests to the most appropriate sources. Prior to Steelbox, the founders worked for Pharsalia Technologies, which was led by Steelbox CEO, Richard "Chip" Howes.  Howes holds 30 patents for designs related to securing and speeding the flow of information over the Internet.

Founders
Richard "Chip" Howes
Bill LeBlanc
Jim Jordan
Tom Bohannon
Scott Higgins
Bill Vaughan

Sample of Customers
UK Highways Agency
Moscow Metro
National Roads Telecommunication Services
Port of Oostende, Belgium Products/ Solutions

A Critic
"The New York City Transit Authority purchased 36 of these units along with a DMSS for each, and had nothing but problems. After a multitude of firmware updates, visits by their field engineers, and failures in the field, they wished they had gone with another vendor such as NICE or Teleste. It is not surprising that the company is now closed.(Robert Marshall, CTA, NYCTA)"

The units described in this quote are the 5600 NAS.  This was a new product built explicitly for the NYCTA because of their cabinet depth requirement. The 5600s were Linux NAS units, not Steelbox switches (DMSS).

Companies established in 2003
Companies based in Atlanta
Networking companies